Corey William Large (born 18 October 1975) is a Canadian writer, actor, and producer of feature movies.

Early life and education
Large was born and raised in the Prospect Lake area of Saanich near Victoria, British Columbia, Canada. After elementary school, he enrolled at St. Michaels University School.

Career
Large initially found work as a model. At age 21, he moved across the Georgia Strait and enrolled at the Vancouver Film School and later at the American Academy of Dramatic Arts in Los Angeles. He had background roles in the films Excess Baggage and Disturbing Behavior, before moving into post-production and financing projects.

He returned to St. Michaels University School to produced and act in Window Theory. He returned to his native Victoria to begin shooting a series of films, starting with Cannabis Kid.

Large currently splits his time between Santa Monica, Victoria and Hawaii.

Filmography

Film

Television

As producer
  Window Theory, 2005 (executive producer)
 Chasing Ghosts, 2005 (executive producer)
 7-10 Split, 2007 (executive producer)
 Fusion: Kanye West, Gnarls Barkley, Lupe Fiasco, 2007 (TV movie) (producer)
 Tooth and Nail, 2007 (executive producer)
 Senior Skip Day, 2008 (video) (executive producer)
 The Art of Travel, 2008  (executive producer)
 Loaded, 2008  (producer)
 Cabin Fever 2: Spring Fever, 2009 (executive producer)
 Toxic, 2010 (producer)
 The Penthouse, 2010 (producer)
 Gun, 2010 (executive producer)
 Hello Herman, 2011 (executive producer)
 Cross, 2011 (video) (executive producer)
 The Legend of Awesomest Maximus, 2011 (executive producer)
 The Obama Effect, 2012 (executive producer)
 Fire with Fire, 2012 (executive producer)
 Don Peyote, 2012 (executive producer)
 Welcome to the Jungle, 2013 (executive producer)
 Some Velvet Morning, 2013 (associate producer)
 Cannabis Kid, 2013 (producer)
 In Like Flynn, 2018 (producer)
 Vendetta, 2022 (producer)
 Detective Knight: Rogue, 2022 (producer)
 Paradise City, 2022 (producer)
 Detective Knight: Redemption, 2022 (producer)
 Detective Knight: Independence, 2023 (producer)
 American Metal, 2023 (producer)
 One Ranger, TBA (producer)

As writer
 Window Theory, 2005 (story)
 Chasing Ghosts, 2005 (story)
 Loaded, 2008 (writer)
 Toxic, 2010 (story)
 The Penthouse, 2010 (story)
 Detective Knight: Rogue, 2022 (writer)
 Paradise City, 2022 (story)
 Detective Knight: Redemption, 2022 (writer)
 Detective Knight: Independence, 2023 (writer)

References 

Living people
Film producers from British Columbia
Canadian male film actors
Canadian male television actors
Male actors from British Columbia
People from the Capital Regional District
1975 births